Frank Cutter (25 February 1921 – 2 February 2009) was an  Australian rules footballer who played with Hawthorn in the Victorian Football League (VFL).

Notes

External links 

1921 births
2009 deaths
Australian rules footballers from Victoria (Australia)
Hawthorn Football Club players